The Ledzokuku-Krowor Municipal Assembly (LEKMA) Hospital is a hospital located at Teshie in Accra. It is a government hospital.

References 

Hospitals in Ghana